Veeru Potla is an Indian film director and screenwriter who works primarily in Telugu cinema. He known for directing film such as Bindaas and Ragada and  writing story for Varsham and Nuvvostanante Nenoddantana.

Personal life
Veeru Potla was born in Piduguralla, Guntur district, Andhra Pradesh into a farmer's family. He completed his secondary & higher education in Piduguralla. Potla's interest in film brought him to Hyderabad, India, where he started his career as a screenwriter. He married a girl from a family with no film experience in Rajahmundry. 
Potla has said that he admires directors K.Viswanath & Woody Allen.

Career
Veeru Potla made his debut in 2004 as a screenwriter with the film, Varsham, which starred Prabhas and Trisha and in 2005, Nuvvostanante Nenoddantana, starring Siddharth and Trisha directed by Prabhu Deva. In 2010 he directed Bindaas, starring Manoj Manchu and Ragada, starring Nagarjuna. Both of the films he directed  received positive reviews. His latest venture, Doosukeltha starring Vishnu Manchu gained positive reviews and declared as a Hit at Boxoffice.

Filmography

References

Living people
Film directors from Andhra Pradesh
Telugu film directors
People from Guntur district
Telugu screenwriters
Indian male screenwriters
Screenwriters from Andhra Pradesh
21st-century Indian dramatists and playwrights
21st-century Indian film directors
21st-century Indian male writers
Year of birth missing (living people)
21st-century Indian screenwriters